Mellerio dits Meller is a French jewellery house, founded in 1613, and still active today. It is the oldest family company in Europe. It gives its name to the Mellerio cut, a 57-facet jewel cut, shaped as an oval within an ellipse. Today Mellerio is based in rue de la Paix, Paris, with branches in Luxembourg and Japan. It is a member of the Comité Colbert and also of the Henokiens, an international club made up of family companies over 200 years old. Directors François and Olivier Mellerio are the fourteenth generation to run the family business.

History
The firm started in 1613, founded by the Mellerio family from Valle Vigezzo, under the patronage of Marie de Médicis.

Jean-Baptiste Mellerio (1765-1850) started trading in Versailles in 1777, and attracted the patronage of Queen Marie Antoinette. According to Côme Mellerio referring to his company's archives, on the day of the French Revolution (14 July 1789), the sales of their Mellerio shop in Paris were excellent. In 1796, he set up shop on rue Vivienne, Versailles, retaining the patronage of the Empress Josephine.

Francois Mellerio (1772-1843) moved the firm to Paris, initially at 4, rue du Coq Saint-Honoré. In 1815, he moved the workshop to 9, rue de la Paix in Paris, where it remains today. After the restoration of the French monarchy in 1830, Mellerio became suppliers to Queen Marie-Amélie and King Louis-Philippe.

Jean-François Mellerio (1815-1896) opened a branch in Madrid in 1850 from which he supplied customers including Queen Isabella II and the future Empress Eugenie of France.

The company's estimated sales (in 2010/2011) were €8 million.

Notable works
Mellerio has an archive of about 100,000 items.

Trophies
Mellerio made the Coupe des Mousquetaires trophy, awarded to the winner of the Men's Singles competition at the French Open since 1981. It is in the form of a large silver bowl, with a vine leaf trim.  Winners receive a pure silver replica of the trophy, specially made and engraved for each winner by the maison Mellerio.

Mellerio has made the ceremonial sword for members of the Académie française, including François Cheng. Each sword is unique, with the hilt decorated with symbols of its owner's achievements.

Tiaras and royal jewels
The Mellerio Shell tiara was given to Infanta Isabella of Spain as a wedding present from her mother Queen Isabella II in 1868. The tiara had been made by Mellerio for the 1867 Paris Exhibition. It is made of diamonds in the shape of shells decorated with pearls. It remains part of the Spanish Royal Family jewels, worn today by Queen Sofia of Spain.

Mellerio is also attributed with the creation of the Spanish Floral Tiara, made of diamonds in a pattern of flowers, which was a wedding gift to the future Queen Sofia from General Franco on her marriage to Juan Carlos of Spain in 1962.

The jewel collection of the Dutch royal family includes a tiara made by Mellerio for Queen Emma. The ruby tiara is part of a set made in 1889.

Mellerio also made the rose pattern diamond tiara bought by Victor Emmanuel II of Italy for the 1868 wedding of his son, Prince Umberto, to Margherita of Savoy.

A 1742 peacock brooch by Mellerio was worn by Anita Delgado as princess of Kapurthala.

Mellerio family

At one time, the family owned the Pavilon de Musique in Versailles, built for Princess Marie Joséphine of Savoy.

The events surrounding the death of Antoine Mellerio in 1870 inspired Robert Browning’s 1873 poem "Red Cotton Night-Cap Country".

André Mellerio (1862-1943) was an art critic and publisher, and author of ‘ Mouvement idéaliste en peinture’ (1896) who popularised the work of the artists Odilon Redon and Charles Guilloux.

Charles Mellerio (1879 – 1978) was an artist whose watercolours were exhibited many times at the Salon des Artistes Français at the Grand Palais. He received the Prix de Rome award for drawing at the age of 20.

Further reading

References

Luxury brands
Jewellery companies of France
Companies established in 1613
1613 establishments in France
Comité Colbert members
Henokiens companies